An occupational fatality is a death that occurs while a person is at work or performing work related tasks. Occupational fatalities are also commonly called "occupational deaths" or "work-related deaths/fatalities" and can occur in any industry or occupation.

Common causes
Common causes of occupational fatalities include falls, machine-related incidents, motor vehicle accidents, electrocution, falling objects, homicides and suicides. Oftentimes, occupational fatalities can be prevented.

In the United States in 2007, 42% of occupational fatalities occurred during a transportation incident, 16% occurred after a worker came into contact with an object or equipment, 15% occurred as a result of a fall, 15% occurred as a result of assault or other violent acts in the workplace, 12% were the result of chemical or environmental exposures (9%) and 3% were the result of fires or explosions.

Incidence
Data on the number of occupational fatalities per 100,000 workers is available from the International Labor Organization for various countries; the ILO says for most countries the rate is less than ten per 100,000 each year. However, a 1999 paper says the ILO figures are underestimates -- for example the agricultural sector, which has a higher than average fatality rate, is not reported by many countries.  The paper estimates that the number of fatal occupational accidents in the world in 1994 was 335,000, or 14 per 100,000 workers.  The paper also estimated there were 158,000 fatalities commuting  between work and home; and 325,000 fatal occupational diseases; for a total of 818,000 fatalities.

Gender differences
According to Bureau of Labor Statistics men made up 91.4 percent of all workplace fatalities and 85.5 percent of intentional injuries by a person in 2021. In European Union men made up 92.5 percent of all workplace fatalities in 2020 and 66.5 percent of all injuries that required 4 or more days of absence.

Prevention 

Occupational fatalities are preventable. Prevention of occupational fatalities depends on the understanding that worker safety is not only the responsibility of the worker, but is the primary responsibility of the employer.  Employers must train all employees in the appropriate safety procedures and maintain a safe working environment so that fatalities are less likely to occur. An occupational fatality is not just the fault of the deceased worker; instead, it is the combination of unsafe work environments, insufficient safety training, and negligible employee supervision that contribute fatal incidents. As a result, it is imperative that an employer address all the potential [risk] factors at the workplace and educate all employees in safe work practices and risk awareness.

In order to perform adequate risk assessment of injuries that occur in the workplace, health and safety professionals use resources such as the Haddon Matrix.  This model assesses the risks leading up to, during, and after a death in order to prevent future incidents of a similar nature. Employers and employees can learn how to identify risk factors in their work environment in order to avoid incidents that may result in death.

Research, regulation, reporting and recommendations

United States
In the United States, the regulatory organization for occupational injury control and prevention is the Occupational Safety and Health Administration (OSHA).  Formed in 1970 as an agency of the United States Department of Labor under the Occupational Safety and Health Act, OSHA exists to prevent occupational injuries and deaths by creating and enforcing standards in the workplace.  OSHA standards address employee training programs, safety equipment, employer record keeping and proper maintenance of the work environment.  Failure to comply with the OSHA standards can result in workplace inspections and legal action including citations and fines.  In very severe cases of employer misconduct, OSHA can "red flag" an operation and send the employer to legal court.

To regulate the millions of workplaces in the United States, OSHA requires that all employers maintain a record of occupational injuries, illnesses and fatalities.  Occupational fatalities must be reported to OSHA within eight hours of the incident.  Failure to do so can result in legal action against the employer.  Employers are responsible for staying current on OSHA standards and enforcing them in their own workplace. State OSHA organizations exist in twenty-eight states and are required to have the same or more rigorous standards than the federal OSHA standards.  In these states, employers must abide by their state's regulations. It is not the responsibility of the employee to stay current on the OSHA standards.

In addition to OSHA, the National Institute for Occupational Safety and Health (NIOSH) was formed under the Occupational Safety and Health Act as a federal research agency to formulate industry recommendations for health and safety. NIOSH is part of the Centers for Disease Control and Prevention (CDC) in the United States Department of Health and Human Services (DHHS).  NIOSH analyzes workplace injury and illness data from all fifty states as well as provides support for state-based projects in occupational health and safety.

Under NIOSH, the Fatality Assessment and Control Evaluation (FACE) Program tracks and investigates occupational fatalities in order to provide recommendations for prevention.  A voluntary program for individual states created in 1989, FACE is active in California, Iowa, Kentucky, Massachusetts, Michigan, New Jersey, New York, Oregon, and Washington. The primary responsibilities of the state FACE programs are to track occupational fatalities in their state, investigate select fatalities, and provide recommendations for prevention.   As part of the prevention efforts, FACE programs also produce extensive prevention education materials that are disseminated to employees, employers, unions, and state organizations.

Nationally, the Census of Fatal Occupational Injuries (CFOI), within the U.S. Department of Labor, compiles national fatality statistics.  CFOI is the key, comprehensive system in the surveillance of occupational fatalities in the United States.

Many other non-governmental organizations also work to prevent occupational fatalities.  Trade associations and unions play an active role in protecting workers and disseminating prevention information.  The National Safety Council also works to prevent occupational fatalities as well as provide resources to employers and employees.

References

External links
 World Health Organization Occupational Health Programmes
 International Labour Organization
 British Health and Safety Executive
 Canadian Centre for Occupational Health and Safety
 Australian Safety and Compensation Council
 USA Occupational Safety and Health Administration (OSHA)
 USA National Institute for Occupational Safety and Health (NIOSH)
 USA Fatality Assessment and Control Evaluation (FACE) Program
 Washington State Fatality Assessment and Control Evaluation (WA FACE) Program
 USA Census of Fatal Occupational Injury (CFOI)
 National Safety Council
 AFL-CIO
 California Fatality Assessment and Control Evaluation Program (CA FACE)

Occupational safety and health
National Institute for Occupational Safety and Health